Bernardo Perin (5 December 1897 – 18 April 1964) was an Italian footballer who played as a midfielder. He represented the Italy national football team four times, the first being on 6 March 1921, the occasion of a friendly match against Switzerland in a 2–1 home win.

Honours

Player
Bologna
Italian Football Championship: 1924–25, 1928–29

References

1897 births
1964 deaths
Italian footballers
Italy international footballers
Association football midfielders
L.R. Vicenza players
Modena F.C. players
Inter Milan players
Bologna F.C. 1909 players